Beat Bösch (born 27 November 1971) is a Paralympic athlete from Switzerland competing mainly in category T52 sprint events.

Bösch took part in his first Summer Paralympics in 2000. Four years later he competed in the 2004 Summer Paralympics in Athens, Greece.  There he won a silver medal in the men's 100 metres – T52 event and a bronze medal in the men's 200 metres – T52 event.

In the 2008 Summer Paralympics in Beijing, China, he won a silver medal in the men's 100 metres – T52 event, a silver medal in the 200 metres and went out in the first round of the 400 metres.

He also competed in the 2012 Summer Paralympics in London, where he was his country's flag bearer in the opening ceremony. He competed in the 100m, 200m and 400m events, finishing fourth in both the 100 and 200 metre events.

References

External links
 
 Beat Bösch Home Page (in German)

Paralympic athletes of Switzerland
Athletes (track and field) at the 2000 Summer Paralympics
Athletes (track and field) at the 2004 Summer Paralympics
Athletes (track and field) at the 2008 Summer Paralympics
Athletes (track and field) at the 2012 Summer Paralympics
Paralympic silver medalists for Switzerland
Swiss male wheelchair racers
Living people
1971 births
Medalists at the 2004 Summer Paralympics
Medalists at the 2008 Summer Paralympics
Paralympic bronze medalists for Switzerland
Paralympic medalists in athletics (track and field)
Medalists at the World Para Athletics European Championships
Sportspeople from the canton of Lucerne